Death and Destruction is a 1980 board game published by Uncontrollable Dungeon Master.

Gameplay
Death and Destruction is a game where both sides have 32 pieces, each with a different name and abilities, each represented by poker chips.

Reception
Steve Jackson reviewed Death and Destruction in The Space Gamer No. 34. Jackson commented that "If you like chess (and its complex variants), this game is worth attention, even at its rather high price.  If you don't like chess and similar games, D and D will hold nothing for you.  It's a fascinating effort, but its production and playtest flaws will probably keep it from going far.  Pity."

References

Board games introduced in 1980